The Colebrook Store is a historic commercial building at 559 Colebrook Road in the village center of Colebrook, Connecticut.  Built in 1812, it has operated as a local general store since then, and is an architectural landmark for its two-story temple front.  It was listed on the National Register of Historic Places in 1976.

Description and history
The Colebrook Store stands prominently in the rural community's village center, at the northwest corner of Route 183 (Colebrook Road) and Rockwell Road.  It is a -story wood-frame structure, with a gabled roof and clapboarded exterior.  Its front is distinguished by a two-story Federal temple front, consisting of a fully pedimented gable supported by four slender Tuscan columns.  At the center of the gable is a Federal style half-round fan.  Behind the columns, the facade is symmetrical and covered with flushboarding, with windows flanking doorways on both levels; the second-floor doorway having previously served as a loading entry.  The doorways and windows appear to be late 19th-century replacements, as are a number of the fixtures inside the store.  Features from that period include hardwood flooring, tin ceilings, and counters.

The store was built in 1812 by William Swift, a local carpenter whose principal product was bedsteads.  Swift was apparently well traveled, and was able to execute a distinct interpretation of the Adam style of Federal architecture in this building.  He is also credited with construction of the Solomon Rockwell House in Winsted.  The store has long been a fixture of the rural community, often used as a reference point in 19th-century descriptions of the area.  It continues to serve the community and tourists as a general store.

See also
National Register of Historic Places listings in Litchfield County, Connecticut

References

Commercial buildings on the National Register of Historic Places in Connecticut
Buildings and structures completed in 1812
Buildings and structures in Litchfield County, Connecticut
National Register of Historic Places in Litchfield County, Connecticut
Colebrook, Connecticut
Historic district contributing properties in Connecticut